The 1965–66 NCAA University Division men's ice hockey season began in November 1965 and concluded with the 1966 NCAA University Division Men's Ice Hockey Tournament's championship game on March 19, 1966, at the Williams Arena in Minneapolis, Minnesota. This was the 19th season in which an NCAA ice hockey championship was held and is the 72nd year overall where an NCAA school fielded a team.

Minnesota–Duluth joined the WCHA beginning with this season. Pennsylvania promoted their club program to varsity status and began playing as an independent.

Regular season

Season tournaments

Standings

1966 NCAA Tournament

Note: * denotes overtime period(s)

Player stats

Scoring leaders

The following players led the league in points at the conclusion of the season.

GP = Games played; G = Goals; A = Assists; Pts = Points; PIM = Penalty minutes

Leading goaltenders
The following goaltenders led the league in goals against average at the end of the regular season while playing at least 33% of their team's total minutes.

GP = Games played; Min = Minutes played; W = Wins; L = Losses; OT = Overtime/shootout losses; GA = Goals against; SO = Shutouts; SV% = Save percentage; GAA = Goals against average

Awards

NCAA

ECAC

WCHA

See also
 1965–66 NCAA College Division men's ice hockey season

References

External links
College Hockey Historical Archives
1965–66 NCAA Standings

 
NCAA